Lilhac is a commune in the Haute Garonne department in southwestern France.

Population

Local inhabitants are called Lilhacais.

Geography
Lilhac lies roughly 65 km southwest from Toulouse. Its altitude at the highest point is 380 metres, and covers an area of 730ha or 7.3 km².

The river Touch has its source in the commune.

History
Lilhac was registered as a commune in 1668. The local church, Eglise St-Quitterie, dedicated to Saint Quiteria, dates to before the 18th century.

See also
Communes of the Haute-Garonne department

References

Communes of Haute-Garonne
1668 establishments in France